Witchkrieg is the fifth full-length studio album by the Swedish thrash metal band Witchery, released on 21 June 2010 in Europe and 29 June 2010 in North America. This album is their second on Century Media Records. Like their previous album, Don't Fear the Reaper, Witchkrieg was mixed by Tue Madsen at his Antfarm Studios. Witchkrieg showcases an impressive line-up of guest musicians such as Andy LaRocque from King Diamond, Kerry King from the thrash band Slayer, Hank Shermann of Mercyful Fate, Lee Altus and Gary Holt from Exodus and Jim Durkin from Dark Angel.

This is the first Witchery album without the long time vocalist Tony "Toxine" Kampner. His replacement is Erik "Legion" Hagstedt.

Track listing
All songs written by Patrik Jensen.

Personnel

Witchery
Erik "Legion" Hagstedt: vocals
Patrik Jensen: rhythm guitar
Rille Rimfält: rhythm and lead guitar
Sharlee D'Angelo: bass guitar
Martin Axenrot: drums, percussion

Additional musicians
Guest lead guitars:
Andy LaRocque
Kerry King
Hank Shermann
Lee Altus
Gary Holt
Jim Durkin

Production
Mixed and mastered by Tue Madsen

References

External links
Witchery at Century Media

2010 albums
Witchery albums
Century Media Records albums